The 2005 NCAA Division I Men's Basketball Championship Game was the finals of the 2005 NCAA Division I men's basketball tournament and it determined the national champion for the 2004-05 NCAA Division I men's basketball season  The 2005 National Title Game was played on April 4, 2005, at Edward Jones Dome in St. Louis, Missouri. The 2005 National Title Game was played between the 2005 Chicago Regional Champions, #1-seeded Illinois and the 2005 Syracuse Regional Champions, #1-seeded North Carolina.

North Carolina took off with a 40–27 lead at the half and Illinois failed to mount a comeback win after coming back as much as 15. The Tar Heels won 75–70, for their 4th national championship, and first under Roy Williams.

For the 1st time since 1999, the national championship game was played between two #1 seeds.

Participants

Illinois

Illinois entered the 2005 NCAA Tournament as the #1 seed in the Chicago Regional. In the 1st round of the 2005 NCAA Tournament, Illinois survived a scare from Fairleigh Dickinson, rolling away with a 67–55 win after leading by just one at halftime. In the 2nd round of the 2005 NCAA Tournament, Illinois beat Nevada 71-59 for the chance to face Milwaukee in the Sweet 16 and in the Sweet 16, the Illinois backcourt propelled them to a 77–63 win over Milwaukee to advance to the 2005 Chicago Regional Finals. In the 2005 Chicago Regional Finals, Illinois came back from a 15-point deficit with four minutes remaining to beat Arizona 90–89 in overtime to keep Illinois title hopes alive with a trip to the 2005 Final Four. In the 2005 Final Four, Illinois dominated Louisville in the 2nd half, outscoring them 41–29. They would go on to win 72-57 and advance to the 2005 National Title Game.

North Carolina

North Carolina entered the 2005 NCAA Tournament as the #1 seed in the Syracuse Regional. In the 1st round of the 2005 NCAA Tournament, North Carolina used 73% shooting in the 1st half to claim a 96–68 victory over Oakland. In the 2nd round of the 2005 NCAA Tournament, Sean May dominated with a double-double with 24 points and 17 rebounds and Marvin Williams also dominated with a double-double with 20 points and 15 rebounds which led to UNC beating Iowa State for a chance to face Villanova in the Sweet 16 and North Carolina would hold off Villanova in the Sweet 16 beating them 67–66 to advance to the Elite Eight. In the Elite Eight, Sean May had a double-double with 29 points and 12 rebounds  and Rashad McCants scored 21 points to beat Wisconsin 88–82 to advance to the 2005 Final Four. In the 2005 Final Four, North Carolina beat Michigan State 87–71 to advance to the 2005 National Title Game.

Team rosters

Starting lineups

Game Summary

North Carolina was playing looking for its 4th National Championship while Illinois was playing in its first National Championship. It was a tight contest for much of the first half before an 8–0 run by North Carolina allowed them to take a 35–25 lead. Eventually they would take a 40–27 lead into halftime. North Carolina increased its lead to 15 at one point in the second half. But Illinois began a furious charge. At one point, they would hit seven consecutive shots from the floor to turn a fifteen-point lead back to four. Unfazed, North Carolina would push the lead back up to ten before a 10–0 run by the Illini tied the game at 65-65. Illinois would tie the game at 70–70 on a three by Luther Head. But North Carolina would fight back as freshman Marvin Williams tapped back a Rashad McCants missed shot to put North Carolina back in front. Illinois would get several cracks to take the lead but were unable to convert. Eventually, Raymond Felton was able to steal the ball from Luther Head, forcing Deron Williams to foul. However Felton converted on 1 of 2 free throws giving Illinois one last chance. Head's potential game-tying three pointer bounced high and out and went into the hands of Felton who this time connected on both free throws to give North Carolina a 75–70 victory.  Illinois struggled offensively with what had succeeded the rest of the season, converting only 12 of a championship game record 40 three-point field goal attempts.  With his stellar post play, North Carolina forward Sean May managed to get Illinois defenders into foul trouble; starting junior forward/center James Augustine fouled out, and his substitute, senior Jack Ingram, quickly amassed four fouls.  May scored 26 points as he took the Most Outstanding Player (MOP) of the Final Four.

For North Carolina head coach Roy Williams, it was his first national championship.  Illinois was denied a chance to set the NCAA record for most wins in a season, instead tying the 1998–99 national runner-up Duke team with 37 (Kentucky has since won 38 games in two different seasons).  For almost the entire 2004–05 season, Illinois and North Carolina were ranked #1 and #2, respectively, in all polls, and both teams were the favorites to meet in the national championship game.  With its collection of raw talent, North Carolina would go on to field six players in the NBA draft, while four Illinois players would be selected in future drafts, with undrafted Roger Powell, Jr. also playing briefly in the NBA.  In 2014, Sports Illustrated voted the 2005 Illinois team as the best team ever to not win a title.

References

NCAA Division I Men's Basketball Championship Game
NCAA Division I Men's Basketball Championship Games
Illinois Fighting Illini men's basketball
North Carolina Tar Heels men's basketball
Basketball competitions in St. Louis
College basketball tournaments in Missouri
NCAA Division I Men's Basketball Championship Game
2000s in St. Louis